Shana Petrone (born May 8, 1972, Park Ridge, Illinois) was raised in Fort Lauderdale, Florida and is an American singer of country, freestyle, and dance music.

Shana released an album in 1989 entitled I Want You on Vision Records, which peaked at No. 165 on the Billboard Top 200. The album yielded two U.S. hit singles in 1990, "I Want You" (Billboard Hot 100 peak No. 40) and "You Can't Get Away" (Hot 100 peak No. 82).

After her successes with dance music, Shana disappeared from the mainstream music scene. She reappeared as a country music singer under her full given name, and released three singles with Epic Nashville, "Heaven Bound" in 1998 and "This Time" in 1999. "Heaven Bound" was a hit on CMT and reached No. 60 on the Billboard Hot Country Singles chart. Her third single on country radio was "Something Real", also supported by a music video.  Despite three singles, Shana's country music album on Epic Nashville was never released. She is still recording country music but is no longer signed to a major record label.

Discography

Albums

Singles

Music videos

References

External links
Shana Petrone at MySpace
 at Discogs

1972 births
Living people
20th-century American singers
21st-century American singers
American dance musicians
American women country singers
American country singer-songwriters
American freestyle musicians
Country musicians from Florida
Country musicians from Illinois
Musicians from Fort Lauderdale, Florida
People from Park Ridge, Illinois
Singer-songwriters from Florida
Singer-songwriters from Illinois
20th-century American women singers
21st-century American women singers